Vikas Shive Gowda (born 5 July 1983) is an Indian discus thrower and shot putter. Born in Mysore, he grew up in Frederick, Maryland in the United States. His father, Shive Gowda, coached the 1988 Indian Olympic track team. Vikas Gowda is a Padma Shri awardee in 2017.

He is an alumnus of the University of North Carolina at Chapel Hill and the 2006 US NCAA National Champion in discus.

His personal best throw is 66.28 meters which is also Indian national record in discus throw, achieved in 2012. He contested at the 2008 Beijing Olympics but failed to reach the finals after finishing 22nd in the qualifiers, with a throw of 60.69 m. In 2012 London Olympics, Vikas qualified for the finals, at the fifth place, with a throw of 65.20 m  and finished eighth in the final.

He won his first gold medal in Asian Championships in 2013 in Pune, with a throw of 64.90 meters. He won the discus throw event at the 2014 Commonwealth Games,  which made him the second Indian man to win a Commonwealth gold medal, 56 years after Milkha Singh.

After the qualification standard was lowered, he qualified for the 2016 Olympics in the discus, making this his fourth Olympics.

International competitions

References

1983 births
Living people
Sportspeople from Mysore
Sportspeople from Frederick, Maryland
Indian male discus throwers
Indian male shot putters
Olympic athletes of India
Athletes (track and field) at the 2004 Summer Olympics
Athletes (track and field) at the 2008 Summer Olympics
Athletes (track and field) at the 2012 Summer Olympics
Athletes (track and field) at the 2016 Summer Olympics
Asian Games medalists in athletics (track and field)
Athletes (track and field) at the 2006 Asian Games
Athletes (track and field) at the 2010 Asian Games
Athletes (track and field) at the 2014 Asian Games
Commonwealth Games medallists in athletics
Commonwealth Games gold medallists for India
Commonwealth Games silver medallists for India
Athletes (track and field) at the 2006 Commonwealth Games
Athletes (track and field) at the 2010 Commonwealth Games
Athletes (track and field) at the 2014 Commonwealth Games
World Athletics Championships athletes for India
North Carolina Tar Heels men's track and field athletes
Kannada people
Asian Games silver medalists for India
Asian Games bronze medalists for India
Medalists at the 2010 Asian Games
Medalists at the 2014 Asian Games
Recipients of the Padma Shri in sports
Athletes from Karnataka
Recipients of the Rajyotsava Award 2010
Recipients of the Arjuna Award
Medallists at the 2010 Commonwealth Games
Medallists at the 2014 Commonwealth Games